There's More Where That Came From is the sixth studio album by American country music artist Lee Ann Womack, released in 2005. It received numerous awards and critical acclaim and was also Womack's highest selling album since 2000's I Hope You Dance. The album was Womack's return to a traditional country music style, producing three charting singles between 2004 and 2006: "I May Hate Myself in the Morning", "He Oughta Know That by Now" and "Twenty Years and Two Husbands Ago", which peaked at numbers 10, 22, and 32, respectively, on the Hot Country Songs charts. Womack's ex-husband, Jason Sellers, sang background vocals on "I May Hate Myself in the Morning".

There's More Where That Came From won Album of the Year, and Single of the Year for "I Hate Myself in the Morning", at the 39th Country Music Association Awards. It was also nominated for Album of the Year at the 40th Academy of Country Music Awards.

Background
Womack told The Dallas Morning News that MCA Nashville inspired her to record another album and said "I was sitting at home after Something Worth Leaving Behind thinking, 'Gosh, I thought this is what people wanted. And they didn't want it so obviously I don't know.' And they were the ones who came to me and said, 'When are you going to give us a record?' That's when I started thinking, 'Well, if they want a record, I'll make 'em one.'" She also said, "When I started making this record, I said I'm gonna have fun, and that's it. I'm not going to worry about does this sound right coming from a woman, or is this too country, or is this intro too long? I wanted this record to sound like where I came from."

Womack told Billboard,  "I thought so much, harder than I've ever worked before on a record on 'Something Worth Leaving Behind,' and it just didn't work. I promised myself with this record I wouldn't think at all. I would just totally follow my heart and not my head." Womack told The Mirror, "These are songs that aren't afraid to tell the truth. It is definitely honest music as far as the lyrics go. They're a slice of life – the good, bad and the ugly."

Critical reception

Rhapsody ranked the album #6 on its "Country’s Best Albums of the Decade" list. "Lee Ann Womack's There's More... is an album steeped in an old-school country tradition: tales of dead-end relationships, cheating and broken hearts abound. The traditional-sounding arrangements – featuring steel guitar, piano, harmonica and fiddle, – help color a page from a bygone era, leaning heavily on the sepia-toned '70s for a classic, "old country" sound. Case in point: the stunning "I May Hate Myself in the Morning" sounds like a long-lost country gem from the 1970s and is one of the CD's many highlights. This release is a classic in every sense of the word." CMT ranked it on its "A Dozen Favorite Country Albums of the Decade" list. 
Engine 145 country music blog list it #2 on the "Top Country Albums of the Decade" list.

Kelefa Sanneh of the New York Times gave the album a positive review and wrote, "There's no denying that There's More Where That Came From works: it's a strikingly handsome album, with tunes so sweet you might almost miss the unexpectedly bleak lyrics. Packaging and marketing aside, this album isn't really so different from the albums Ms. Womack has been making all along; it's just that she's found an uncommonly good set of songs to sing, and a first-rate group of musicians to play them as gently – and as beautifully – as she sings them." Saneh also listed the album as the tenth best of 2005.

Editors at Billboard wrote, "Hallelujah. One of country music's great singers is singing country again – bona fide lovin', cryin' and cheatin' songs. Womack evokes George Jones on the killer "One's a Couple" and tender, world-weary "Twenty Years and Two Husbands Ago." Consider this an early contender for best country album of the year. Editors at The Detroit Free Press gave the album four stars and wrote, "Womack has rooted around in country's earthy past and rediscovered a simple truth: Sin can be a mighty sweet topic, especially when it's approached honestly and accompanied by a fiddle and steel guitar. All we can hope now is that her album title is prophetic. If Womack has more where this came from, we can't wait to hear it." Shane Harrison of The Atlanta Journal gave the album a B+ rating and wrote, "Nothing else is quite as old-school as that opener, but Womack's voice makes sure it's all as country as can be, even if a few of the songs lean a little toward pop. Splitting the difference between Dolly Parton and Wynette, Womack sounds like the good girl plagued by naughty thoughts. She's easily the best truly country female singer mainstream Nashville can claim these days." Joey Guerra of the Houston Chronicle gave the album a positive review and wrote, "Womack's polished approach to the material doesn't match Wright's warts-and-all honesty, but both women are thankfully – and often thrillingly – back to making country music their own way." Sarah Rodman of the Boston Herald gave the album a positive review and wrote, There's More Where That Came From" finds Womack blending contemporary country hooks with a down-home approach to arranging the fiddles, banjos, strings and pedal steel guitars. The easygoing arrangements help Womack purposefully evoke the laid-back, yet sometimes raw sound of such heroes as Loretta Lynn and Tammy Wynette. In between the weepers, Womack kicks up her heels a bit. But even in her bluest blues, you can hear a singer enjoying herself wholeheartedly 

Nick Marino of Entertainment Weekly gave the album a B+ rating and wrote, "It's a patient album, content to float the singer's soprano over pretty melodies that billow like curtains in the breeze. The music serves the lyrics, which dwell on loving, leaving, and aging. More isn't especially cute, nor is it fancy. But it feels the way old country feels." Entertainment Weekly also listed the album as the eight best of 2005. Ralph Novak of People Magazine gave the album three stars in his review and praised "Twenty Years and Two Husbands Ago". Josh Tyrangiel of Time Magazine gave the album a favorable review and praised "Waiting for the Sun to Shine" and said it provides "a much needed reminder that country, more than any other musical genre, still has the potential to offer instant intimacy.

Accolades

Track listing

Production
Produced By Byron Gallimore except "When You Get to Me", produced by Greg Droman
Engineered By Julie Brakey, Greg Droman, Julian King & Sara Lesher
Mixed By Greg Droman & Chuck Ainlay
Mastered By Hank Williams

Personnel
Drums, Percussion: Shannon Forrest, Lonnie Wilson
Bass: Michael Rhodes, Glenn Worf
Piano: Wurlitzer, Organ: Steve Nathan, Jimmy Nichols
Steel: Paul Franklin, Robby Turner
Guitars: Tom Bukovac, Mark Casstevens, Rusty Dannmeyer, David Grissom, Troy Lancaster, B. James Lowry, Brent Mason, Randy Scruggs, Bryan Sutton
Harmonica: Jelly Roll Johnson
Fiddle: Aubrey Haynie
Mandolin: Stuart Duncan, Aubrey Haynie
Backing Vocals: Lisa Cochran, Wes Hightower, Luke Laird, Bill Luther, Chris Rodriguez, Jason Sellers, Harry Stinson, Lee Ann Womack, Andrea Zonn

Chart performance
The album reached number 3 on Billboard's Top Country Albums charts and number 12 on the Billboard 200, giving Womack her third consecutive Top 20 on that chart. The album sold 83,000 during its first week. The album was certified gold by the RIAA for shipments of over 500,000 units.

Weekly charts

Year-end charts

Certifications

References

2005 albums
Albums produced by Byron Gallimore
Lee Ann Womack albums
MCA Records albums